Alleghanyite is a moderately rare humite mineral with formula Mn5(SiO4)2(OH)2, belonging to the nesosilicates class. In general its occurrences are related with metamorphic (metamorphosed) manganese deposits. The mineral is named after Alleghany County, North Carolina, US.

See also
 Jerrygibbsite
 Chondrodite
 Clinohumite
 Humite

References

Manganese(II) minerals
Humite group
Monoclinic minerals
Minerals in space group 14